The Pearson 22 is an American trailerable sailboat that was designed by William Shaw as a racer-cruiser and first built in 1968.

Production
The design was built by Pearson Yachts in the United States from 1968 until 1972, but it is now out of production.

Design
The Pearson 22 is a recreational keelboat, built predominantly of fiberglass with a balsa-cored deck. It has a fractional sloop rig, a raked stem, a slightly reverse transom, an internally mounted spade-type rudder controlled by a tiller and a fixed swept fin keel. It displaces  and carries  of ballast.

The design has sleeping accommodation for four people, with a double "V"-berth in the bow cabin and two straight settee berths in the main cabin. The galley is located on both sides just aft of the bow cabin. The galley is equipped with an optional stove and a sink. The head is located in the bow cabin under the "V"-berth.

Operational history
In a 2010 review Steve Henkel wrote, "Pearson's literature bills this boat as 'to sailing what a sports car is to driving—a high performance ... beautifully balanced design that puts fun into getting there ... took the season championship although she was the smallest boat in her fleet ... headed for one-design racing in many areas.' In hindsight, it appears that reality did not match the brochure writer's dreams. She was discontinued after four years, superseded by slightly larger cruisers like the Pearson 26. Best features: With more ballast, lower center of gravity, and the highest D/L ratio versus her otherwise very similar comp[etitor]s, the Pearson 22 is probably the stiffest boat in the group. That may make her fastest too, sailing without handicap, at least in a moderate breeze. (Her PHRF rating indicates she's fastest, too.) Worst features: She's neither wide nor tall down below, giving her relatively low points on the Space Index scale. The outboard engine controls are far aft of the cockpit, and the prop is beyond the counter stern, which would make us worry about prop cavitation when hobby horsing in a seaway."

See also
List of sailing boat types

References

Keelboats
1960s sailboat type designs
Sailing yachts
Trailer sailers
Sailboat type designs by William Shaw
Sailboat types built by Pearson Yachts